Moose Peak Light is a lighthouse on Mistake Island, just east of Great Wass Island, Maine at the southern entrance to Eastern Bay and five nautical miles southeast of Jonesport. It was first established in 1827. The present structure was built in 1851. Automated since 1972, the light was sold at auction in January 2013 to a private owner from Connecticut.

References

Lighthouses completed in 1827
Lighthouses completed in 1851
Lighthouses in Washington County, Maine
1827 establishments in Maine